Emmanuel "Ema" Twumasi (born 18 May 1997) is a Ghanaian professional footballer who plays for Major League Soccer club FC Dallas.

Career

Youth and college
Twumasi played two years of college soccer at Wake Forest University between 2016 and 2017. He left college early to sign a Generation Adidas contract with Major League Soccer ahead of the MLS SuperDraft.

While at college, Twumasi played with USL PDL sides Michigan Bucks and GPS Portland Phoenix in 2017, appearing for the latter in the US Open Cup.

Professional 
On 19 January 2018, Twumasi was selected 11th overall in the 2018 MLS SuperDraft by FC Dallas. On 2 March 2018, he was loaned to United Soccer League side Oklahoma City Energy. He made his debut on 17 March 2018, appearing as a 60th-minute substitute in a 1–0 win over Tulsa Roughnecks.

On 12 June 2019, Twumasi joined USL Championship side Austin Bold FC on loan until the end of the season. On 6 March 2020, it was announced that the loan would be extended for the 2020 season.

Career statistics

Club

References

External links 
 Wake Forest Profile
 
 
 

1997 births
Living people
Ghanaian footballers
Ghanaian expatriate footballers
Wake Forest Demon Deacons men's soccer players
Flint City Bucks players
GPS Portland Phoenix players
FC Dallas players
OKC Energy FC players
North Texas SC players
Austin Bold FC players
Association football midfielders
Expatriate soccer players in the United States
USL League Two players
USL Championship players
FC Dallas draft picks
Soccer players from Connecticut
Major League Soccer players
USL League One players